{{DISPLAYTITLE:Technetium (99mTc) tilmanocept}}

Technetium (99mTc) tilmanocept, trade name Lymphoseek, is a radiopharmaceutical diagnostic imaging agent used to locate lymph nodes which may be draining from tumors, and assist doctors in locating lymph nodes for removal during surgery.

The most common side effects identified in clinical trials was pain or irritation at the injection site.

It was approved by the U.S. Food and Drug Administration (FDA) in March 2013, for the imaging of lymph nodes.

References

External links 
 

Radiopharmaceuticals
Technetium-99m